Souanké  is a district in the Sangha Region of far north-western Republic of the Congo. The capital lies at Souanke.

Towns and villages

Sangha Department (Republic of the Congo)
Districts of the Republic of the Congo